The 2014–15 Syracuse Silver Knights season was the fourth season of the Syracuse Silver Knights professional indoor soccer club. The Silver Knights, an Eastern Division team in the Major Arena Soccer League, played their home games at the Oncenter War Memorial Arena in downtown Syracuse, New York.

The team was led by owner/head coach Tommy Tanner and assistant coach Joe Papaleo. The Silver Knights earned a 12–8 record and second place in the Eastern Division during the regular season. The team qualified for the playoffs but lost the Eastern Division Semi-Finals to the Rochester Lancers when the tie-breaking mini-game ended 3–2 in Rochester's favor.

Season summary
The Silver Knights struggled early in the season as they lost to the Baltimore Blast in their season opener then again twice more in the course of losing 5 of their first 7 games. Over the next 7 games, they beat the Harrisburg Heat and Rochester Lancers 3 times each, losing only to Baltimore for the fourth and final time this season. Syracuse finished strong, winning 4 of their last 6, but dropping home and road matchups against Rochester. Finishing with a 12–8 record, the Silver Knights placed second (to Baltimore) in the Eastern Division and qualified for the playoffs. They lost to Rochester in the first game of the Eastern Division Semi-Finals on the road then won the second game at home. The decisive 15-minute "mini-game" saw each team score just one goal but Rochester's came from outside the 45-foot arc and Syracuse lost 3–2 under multi-point scoring rules. This was the second consecutive season where Syracuse was forced from the post-season after losing a mini-game tie-breaker in 2014 as they fell to the Baltimore Blast.

History
Launched as an expansion team in the third Major Indoor Soccer League for the 2011–12 season, went a combined 29–41 in their three seasons as members of the MISL, qualifying for the playoffs only once. After the 2013-14 season, Syracuse was one of three teams that left the MISL, leading to the league's collapse. Along with five other former MISL teams, the Silver Knights joined the teams of the Professional Arena Soccer League, which was soon rebranded as the MASL. The other teams in the Eastern Division are former MISL clubs Baltimore Blast and Rochester Lancers, plus PASL clubs Detroit Waza and Harrisburg Heat.

Off-field moves
Four of the five Eastern Division teams (the three former MISL clubs plus Harrisburg) will keep score with multi-point scoring at their home games. Most goals will be worth two points but goals scored from outside a 45-foot arc on the turf will be worth three points. Games played at Detroit or in the Central, Southern, and Pacific Divisions will be scored with traditional soccer scoring where each goal is worth one point.

The Silver Knights have scheduled three jersey auction nights where the team will wear a special uniform top to be auctioned that night for charity. The first, January 16, raises funds for JDRF (formerly known as the Juvenile Diabetes Research Foundation) with all-white jerseys. The second, in February, raises funds to support the families of soldiers stationed at Fort Drum with camouflage jerseys. The third, March 1, raises funds for the Syracuse St. Patrick's Parade with all-green jerseys.

Schedule

Pre-season

Regular season

♣ Game played with traditional soccer scoring (all goals worth 1 point).

Post-season

 Mini-game played as a tie-breaker.

Awards and honors
Syracuse defender Nelson Santana was selected for the 2014-15 MASL All-League Third Team.

Syracuse goalkeeper Rick Pflasterer earned honorable mention for the league's all-rookie team for 2014-15.

References

External links
Syracuse Silver Knights official website
Syracuse Silver Knights at The Post-Standard

Syracuse Silver Knights
Syracuse Silver Knights
Syracuse Silver Knights 2014
Syracuse Silver Knights 2014